Zip.ca was an online DVD rental and movie rental kiosk company operating in Canada. It had a database of over 82,000 unique titles.

Zip.ca was a member of the privately held Momentous Group of companies and was the owner of the Ottawa Rapidz baseball team until its first-season bankruptcy.

On August 17, 2014, Zip.ca announced on its website that it was closing its doors and was no longer shipping discs to its members.

Corporate history

2000s: inception
Zip.ca began its rental operations in February 2004, from its base of operations in Ottawa, Ontario. In July 2005 it arranged to provide the fulfillment services for Rogers Video Direct, a new online subsidiary of one of Canada's largest video store chains. By February 2006, Zip.ca had over 30,000 subscribers. In December 2006, Zip.ca announced passing the 6,000,000 disc rental milestone.

2010s: kiosk debut
Zip.ca's movie rental kiosks were introduced in 2010.

Abandoned digital service 
In July 2009, Zip.ca announced it had partnered with Sonic Solutions as it prepared to offer a streaming video on demand service similar to that introduced in the U.S. in 2007 by its largest American counterpart, Netflix. In May 2011, after Netflix's 2010 Canadian launch as a streaming-only service, Zip.ca announced a further partnership with Samsung, and said its service would launch as a transactional VOD platform, not as a subscription service. The service remained unlaunched at the time of the company's closure in 2014.

Rental plans 

Zip.ca imposed a free shipping limit per month, unless the customer chose the special "Unlimited" plan. When the DVD shipment limit was reached, the customer had to pay for additional shipments ($2.49 per DVD) in the billing month or wait until the next billing month before Zip.ca would continue shipments. In November 2011, Zip.ca began charging a $1 rental fee for each Blu-ray disc. The Blu-ray fee was removed in October 2012. Blu-ray was not available on either of the 1-DVD plans.

Canadian rental marketplace 
On August 30, 2005, Zip.ca announced that it was buying out the online operations of its then main Canadian rival, VHQonline.ca, and has also picked up assets from other companies going out of business.

They also bought out rival Mississauga based Moviesforme

References

Video rental services of Canada
Retail companies established in 2004
Retail companies disestablished in 2014
Companies based in Ottawa
Defunct companies of Ontario
2004 establishments in Ontario
2014 disestablishments in Ontario